Area code 724 is a Commonwealth of Pennsylvania telephone area code in western and southwestern Pennsylvania, including most of the suburbs of Pittsburgh. It was split from area code 412 on February 1, 1998.

Originally, Bell Atlantic wanted to implement 724 as an overlay of 412.  However, overlays were still a new concept at the time, and met with some resistance due to the requirement for ten-digit dialing.  For this reason, 724 was implemented as a split, with nearly all of the old 412 territory outside Allegheny County getting the new area code, making it one of the six pairs of "doughnut area codes" in the numbering plan.

Within only two years, both 724 and 412 were on the verge of exhaustion due to the Pittsburgh area's rapid growth and the proliferation of cell phones and pagers.  By this time, overlays had gained more acceptance, and area code 878 was implemented as an overlay for both the 412 and 724 territories on August 17, 2001.  Since that date, ten-digit dialing has been mandatory in southwestern Pennsylvania.

Number conserving practices allowed for 724 and 412 area code usage to be extended until April, 2013.  The first 878 numbers were issued in April 2013, after 724 was exhausted (and the first 878 numbers in the 412 territory were issued a few years later).

Major Locations in PA using this area code:
Beaver, Butler, Cranberry Township, Ellwood City, Greensburg, Hermitage, Imperial, Indiana, Kittanning, Latrobe, New Castle, North Huntingdon, Oakdale, Sharon, Uniontown, Washington, Waynesburg, & Wexford.

Counties that use this area code
The 724 area code serves parts of fourteen counties in Pennsylvania.

Allegheny County (northern, eastern, and western edges)
Armstrong County (all except northeast portion)
Beaver County
Butler County
Clarion County (portions of west)
Crawford County (extreme southwestern portion only)
Fayette County
Greene County
Indiana County (all except portions of east)
Lawrence County
Mercer County (all except northeastern portion)
Venango County (southeastern portion only)
Washington County
Westmoreland County (all except portion in extreme northeast)

The master list of area codes for Pennsylvania can be found at List of Pennsylvania area codes.

References

External links 
 List of exchanges from AreaCodeDownload.com, 724 Care Area Code

Telecommunications-related introductions in 1998
724
724